Igor Vasilovich Karpenko (Ihor Vasylyovych Karpenko; born July 23, 1976) is a Ukrainian former professional ice hockey goaltender who last played for Sokil Kyiv of the Professional Hockey League. He was selected 185th overall by the Mighty Ducks of Anaheim in the 1995 NHL Entry Draft and spent one season in North America playing for minor league teams. However the majority of his career was spent in Europe, playing for teams in Belarus, Russia, and Ukraine. Internationally Karpenko represented Ukraine in multiple World Championships both at the junior and senior level, and played in the 2002 Winter Olympics.

External links

1976 births
Living people
Anaheim Ducks draft picks
HC Dinamo Minsk players
HC MVD players
Ice hockey players at the 2002 Winter Olympics
Johnstown Chiefs players
Las Vegas Thunder players
Metallurg Magnitogorsk players
Olympic ice hockey players of Ukraine
Port Huron Border Cats players
Saint John Flames players
Sokil Kyiv players
Sportspeople from Kyiv
Ukrainian ice hockey goaltenders
Ukrainian expatriate sportspeople in Canada
Ukrainian expatriate sportspeople in the United States